The 2007 Chinese Super League (CSL 2007) season or the Kingway brewery Chinese Super League as it was known for sponsorship reasons was the fourth edition since its establishment, the 14th season of professional football as well as being the 46th top-tier league season in China. Starting on March 3, 2007 and ending on November 14, 2007 it saw Changchun Yatai clinch the league title for the first time in the last game of the season, while Xiamen Lanshi was relegated with two games to spare. Coincidentally, both of these teams were promoted in the previous season.

The champions as well as the runner-up of the league would qualify for the AFC Champions League 2008 as was the same from the previous season. The Chinese FA Cup was canceled due to the intended expansion of the league to 16 teams, however Shanghai United F.C. and Shanghai Shenhua merged, which saw the Chinese Football Association decide to leave the league with 15 teams for the season.

Promotion and relegation
Teams promoted from the 2006 China League One season
 Henan Jianye
 Zhejiang Greentown

Teams relegated from the 2006 Chinese Super League
 Chongqing Lifan

Clubs

Pre-season change
As Zhu Jun, the owner of Shanghai United F.C. bought a majority share of their crosstown rival. The 7th placed team of the previous season, Shanghai United was merged into two times CSL runner-up Shanghai Shenhua. The new team play under the name Shanghai Shenhua United but use the stadium of the former Shanghai United – Yuanshen Sports Centre Stadium in Pudong, Shanghai as their home ground.

League table

Top scorers

Attendances

League Attendance
Total attendance: 3,173,500 
Average attendance: 15,112

Clubs Attendance

Awards
 Chinese Football Association Footballer of the Year:  Du Zhenyu (Changchun Yatai)
 Chinese Super League Golden Boot Winner:  Li Jinyu (Shandong Luneng Taishan)
 Chinese Football Association Young Player of the Year:  Hao Junmin (Tianjin Teda)
 Chinese Football Association Manager of the Year:  Gao Hongbo (Changchun Yatai)
 Chinese Football Association Referee of the Year:  Sun Baojie 
 Chinese Super League Fair Play Award: Dalian Shide, Tianjin Teda, Beijing Guo'an

See also
Chinese Super League
Football in China
Chinese Football Association
Chinese Football Association Jia League
Chinese Football Association Yi League
Chinese FA Cup

References

External links
 Official site of the Chinese Football Association (in Chinese)
 Official site of the Chinese Super League (in Chinese) 
Yahoo! China – Chinese Super League 2007 (in Chinese)

Chinese Super League seasons
1
China
China